The Landesliga Bayern-Mitte was the sixth tier of the German football league system in southern Bavaria. Until the introduction of the 3. Liga in 2008, it was the fifth tier of the league system, until the introduction of the Regionalligas in 1994 the fourth tier.

The winner of the Landesliga-Mitte automatically qualified for the Bayernliga, the runners-up needed to compete with the runners-up of the other four Landesligas and the 15th placed teams of the Bayernligas for another promotion spot.

The league was disbanded in 2012, when the Regionalliga Bayern was introduced as the new fourth tier of the German league system in Bavaria. Below this league, the Bayernliga was expanded to two divisions while the number of state leagues grew from three to five divisions. A new Landesliga Bayern-Mitte was formed but the territory it now covers varies from the old league, with the clubs from northern Middle Franconia and Upper Palatinate as well as the clubs from southern Lower Bavaria now playing in other leagues.

Overview 

The Landesligen in Bayern were formed in 1963, in place of the 2nd Amateurligas, which operated below the Bayernliga until then. In the region of the Landesliga Mitte, the 2nd Amateurligen were split into three groups, Niederbayern, Oberpfalz and Mittelfranken. The league was formed from eighteen clubs, six of them from the Amateurligas (III) and twelve from the 2nd Amateurligas (IV).

In the first eighteen seasons, up until 1980, only the league champions were promoted to the Bayernliga. This was altered in 1981, when the three Landesliga runners-up were given the opportunity to earn promotion, too, via a promotion round. The Bavarian football association actually stipulates in its rules and regulations that every league champion has to be promoted, unless it declines to do so, and every runners-up has to have the opportunity to earn promotion, too.

Below the league, the Bezirksligas were set as the fifth tier of league football, until 1988, when the Bezirksoberligas were formed. In the first year, three teams were promoted from the Bezirksligas, one from each region; from 1966, it was four clubs. The Landesliga Mitte was fed by the three Bezirksoberligen of Mittelfranken, Oberpfalz and Niederbayern from 1988 onwards. The winner of those were automatically promoted, the runners-up played-off for another promotion spot with the 15th placed team of Landesliga to determine the winner of the last available spot in the Landesliga. The Landesliga Mitte is the only one of the three Bavarian Landesligas to have had three Bezirksoberligas as feeder leagues, the other two only have two each.

For the most part of its history, the league has operated on a strength of eighteen clubs, only occasionally diverting from this when the number of teams relegated from the Bayernliga to it was more than one. With the change in the league system in 1994 and 2008, the introduction of the Regionalliga and the 3. Liga, there were two automatic promotion places available to each of the Landesligen in those seasons.

Disbanding

The Bavarian football federation carried out drastic changes to the league system at the end of the 2011–12 season. With the already decided introduction of the Regionalliga Bayern from 2012–13, it also placed two Bayernligas below the new league as the new fifth tier of the German league system. Below those, five Landesligas instead of the existing three were set, which would be geographically divided to limit travel and increase the number of local derbies.

The clubs from the Landesliga Bayern-Mitte joined the following leagues:
 Champions and runners-up: Promotion round to the Regionalliga, winners to the Regionalliga, losers to the Bayernliga.
 Teams placed 3rd to 8th: Directly qualified to the Bayernliga.
 Teams placed 9th to 15th: Promotion round to the Bayernliga, winners to the Bayernliga, losers to the Landesliga.
 Teams placed 16th or worse: Directly qualified to the Landesliga.

Founding members 
When the league was formed in 1963 as the new fourth tier of the Bavarian league system in Middle Franconia, Upper Palatinate and Lower Bavaria, in place of the 2nd Amateurligas, it consisted of the following eighteen clubs from the following leagues:

 From the Amateurliga Südbayern
 SpVgg Weiden
 1. FC Amberg
 SpVgg Landshut
 From the Amateurliga Nordbayern
 ESV Nürnberg-West
 TSV 04 Schwabach
 ASV Nürnberg-Süd
 From the 2nd Amateurliga Mittelfranken-Nord
 TV Erlangen
 1. FC Hersbruck
 SpVgg Erlangen

 From the 2nd Amateurliga Mittelfranken-Süd
 1. FC Nuremberg II
 FC Stein
 ASV Neumarkt
 From the 2nd Amateurliga Niederbayern
 SV Saal
 FC Dingolfing
 SpVgg Deggendorf
 From the 2nd Amateurliga Oberpfalz
 TuS Rosenberg
 FC Maxhütte-Haidhof
 1. FC Schwarzenfeld

The clubs in the two Amateurligas placed seventh or better were admitted to the new Amateurliga Bayern, all others went to the new Landesligas. The top-three teams in the four regional 2nd Amateurligas were each admitted to the Landesliga.

Top-three of the Landesliga 
The following teams have finished in the top-three in the league:

 Promoted teams in bold.
 The Bavarian football association requires deciders to be played when two teams are on equal points at the end of the season to determine promotion/relegation. Championship deciders were necessary in the following years:
 For first place:
 1964: SpVgg Weiden defeated ESV Nürnberg-West.
 1970: FC Herzogenaurach defeated ASV Neumarkt.
 1976: SpVgg Plattling defeated SpVgg Vohenstrauß.
 1990: SSV Jahn Regensburg defeated 1. FC Passau.
 1991: SpVgg Fürth defeated 1. FC Nuremberg II.
 For second place:
 1989: SpVgg Fürth defeated 1. FC Passau.
 1997: SSV Jahn Regensburg defeated SC 04 Schwabach 3–2.
 2006: TuS Regensburg defeated FSV Erlangen-Bruck 3–2 aet.
 2007: SV Schalding-Heining defeated FSV Erlangen-Bruck 1–0.
 2009: SpVgg Landshut defeated ASV Neumarkt 1–0.

Multiple winners 
The following clubs have won the league more than once:

All-time table 1963–2012 
The SpVgg Landshut holds the top spot in the all-time table of the Landesliga Mitte, with the 1. FC Nuremberg II being second, 319 points behind, SpVgg Jahn Forchheim is third. The last place, number 133, goes to TSV Ergoldsbach on eight points. The 2011–12 season, the leagues last, saw three new teams in the league who had not played at this level before, SV Buckenhofen, FC Ergolding and Dergah Spor Nürnberg.

League placings 1988–2012 

The complete list of clubs and placings in the league from the 1988–89 until 2011–12 seasons:

Key 

 S = No of seasons in league (until 2011-12)

Notes 
 1 In 1996, SpVgg Fürth and TSV Vestenbergsgreuth merged to form SpVgg Greuther Fürth.
 2 In 1995, 1. FC Amberg was declared bankrupt and folded. A new club, FC Amberg, was formed, initially within the TV Amberg system.
 3 In 2000, Jahn Forchheim withdrew from the Bayernliga to the lower amateur leagues.
 4 In 2000, SV Riedelhütte withdrew from the league.
 5 In 1988, Post SV Regensburg merged with TSG Süd Regensburg to form SG Post/Süd Regensburg. In 2002, SG Post/Süd Regensburg joined SSV Jahn Regensburg to become SSV Jahn Regensburg II.
 6 In 2003, SpVgg Grün-Weiß Deggendorf was formed through a merger of SpVgg Deggendorf and SV Grün-Weiß Deggendorf.
 7 In 1967, ASV Nürnberg-Süd merged with TSV Nürnberg to form SV 73 Nürnberg-Süd.
 8 In 2011, SpVgg Weiden declared insolvency in the Regionalliga and was relegated to the Bezirksoberliga Oberpfalz.

League records 1963–2012 
The league records in regards to points, wins, losses and goals for the clubs in the league were:

References

Sources 
 Die Bayernliga 1945 - 1997,  published by the DSFS, 1998
 Deutschlands Fußball in Zahlen,  An annual publication with tables and results from the Bundesliga to Verbandsliga/Landesliga, publisher: DSFS
 Kicker Almanach,  The yearbook on German football from Bundesliga to Oberliga, since 1937, published by the Kicker Sports Magazine
 Süddeutschlands Fussballgeschichte in Tabellenform 1897-1988  History of Southern German football in tables, publisher & author: Ludolf Hyll
 50 Jahre Bayrischer Fussball-Verband  50-year-anniversary book of the Bavarian FA, publisher: Vindelica Verlag, published: 1996

External links 
 Bayrischer Fussball Verband (Bavarian FA) 
 Das deutsche Archiv Historic German league tables 
 Bavarian League tables and results 
 Website with tables and results from the Bavarian Oberliga to Bezirksliga 

Mitte
1963 establishments in West Germany
2012 disestablishments in Germany
Sports leagues established in 1963
Sports leagues disestablished in 2012